The year 1589 in science and technology included a number of events, some of which are listed here.

Astronomy
 Giovanni Antonio Magini's Novæ cœlestium orbium theoricæ congruentes cum observationibus N. Copernici is published in Venice, presenting a geocentric system of celestial spheres in opposition to the Copernican model.

Botany
 Establishment of a botanical garden in Basel.

Exploration
 Publication of Richard Hakluyt's The Principal Navigations, Voiages, Traffiques and Discoueries of the English Nation begins.

Medicine
 Publication of Oswald Gabelchover's Artzneybuch in Tübingen. This medical textbook will go through at least eight editions.
 Baldo Angelo Abati : De admirabili viperae natura et de mirificis eiusdem facultatibus published at Urbino.

Births
 July 3 : Johann Georg Wirsung, German anatomist (died 1643).

Deaths
 January – Thomas Penny, English botanist and entomologist (born 1530)
 April 7 – Julius Caesar Aranzi, Italian anatomist (born 1530)
 Probable date – Bernard Palissy, French ceramicist and hydraulic engineer (born c. 1510)

References

 
16th century in science
1580s in science